William Kenneth Russell Mallen (October 4, 1884 – April 23, 1930) was a Canadian professional ice hockey player. He won two Stanley Cups in his career, in 1910 with the Ottawa Senators, and in 1915 with the Vancouver Millionaires. Mallen played over 150 games in his career.

Playing career

Born in Morrisburg, Ontario, Mallen played one season with Cornwall of the Federal Amateur Hockey League (FAHL) before turning professional with the Calumet Miners of the International Professional Hockey League (IPHL) in 1904. His first season, he scored 38 goals in 24 games to establish a goal-scorer's reputation. He left the IPHL because of the rough play in December 1905, returning to the FAHL, although he returned to Calumet for one final season in 1907.

Mallen played in 1907–08 with Toronto of the Ontario Professional Hockey League and the Montreal Hockey Club, then played another season in the United States for the Pittsburgh Athletic Club of the Western Pennsylvania Hockey League (WPHL). Mallen continued his team-hopping ways, playing in Ottawa from December 1909 until December 1910, then the Quebec Bulldogs in 1910–11, before moving out west to play in the Pacific Coast Hockey Association (PCHA), where he played three seasons with the New Westminster Royals, one with the Vancouver Millionaires, one with the Victoria Aristocrats and one with the Spokane Canaries before retiring in 1917.

His older brother Jim Mallen was also a professional ice hockey player and the two brothers played on the same Calumet Miners team in the 1905–06 and 1906–07 seasons.

Playing style
Ken Mallen was known as one of the speediest players of his era and he was also a capable goal scorer. During the 1912–13 PCHA season Mallen won a speed skating contest against fellow PCHA players Moose Johnson, Si Griffis and Cyclone Taylor, all of them considered to be among the quickest players in the game at the time. Mallen played both as a winger and as a rover during his career.

Post career
After retiring from hockey, Mallen worked as a referee and a skating instructor, teaching speed-skating in Ottawa and skating for the London, Ontario Skating Club.

Statistics

References

Bibliography

Notes

External links

The Millionaire Forgotten by The Stanley Cup Tom Hawthorn, June 8, 2011, TheTyee.ca

1884 births
1930 deaths
Calumet Miners players
Canadian ice hockey right wingers
Ice hockey people from Ontario
New Westminster Royals players
Montreal Hockey Club players
Montreal Wanderers players
Ottawa Senators (original) players
Ottawa Senators (NHA) players
Pittsburgh Athletic Club (ice hockey) players
Quebec Bulldogs (NHA) players
Spokane Canaries players
Stanley Cup champions
Vancouver Millionaires players
Victoria Aristocrats players